La Marche is a railway station in La Marche, Bourgogne-Franche-Comté, France. The station is located on the Moret-Lyon railway. The station is served by TER (local) services operated by SNCF.

Train services

The station is served by regional trains towards Cosne-sur-Loire and Nevers.

References

Railway stations in Nièvre